Reif Estate Winery is located in Niagara-on-the-Lake in  Ontario, Canada. Reif Estate is primarily known for playing an important in role pioneering the Ontario wine Industry, as well as planting some of the first Vitis vinifera vines in the Niagara region.

History

Before Reif Estate Winery settled on the banks of the Niagara River, the family tradition of winemaking traces back 13 generations, starting in Germany. The Reif family tradition of winemaking began in the 17th century in a small winemaking town called Neustadt, Germany.

In 1977, Ewald Reif moved to Canada and purchase a plot of land, where the winery is still situated today. After purchasing the land, Ewald began uprooting existing Vitis labrusca grapes that were planted on the property, replacing them with Vitis vinifera vines. Ewald opened Reif Estate Winery in 1982. The winery's first vintages in 1982 included Riesling, Gewürztraminer and Vidal. In 1984 Reif produced its first Icewine.

In 1987, Klaus W. Reif took over from his Uncle Ewald as President and Winemaker at Reif Estate Winery. In 1990, Roberto DiDomenico became winemaker.

Vineyard
Reif Estate's  vineyard is located in Niagara Peninsula appellation, in the Niagara River sub-appellation. The Niagara River sub-appellation is characterized by its east facing slopes, offering grape varieties necessary sun exposure during the day. In addition, the Niagara river acts as a convective current which moderates vineyard temperatures and ultimately extends the growing season. The number of degree days in the Niagara River sub-appellation is 1470. Some of the first vines grown on the Estate included Chardonnay, Cabernet Sauvignon and Riesling.

White Varieties include: Chardonnay, Chenin blanc, Gewürztraminer, Pinot grigio, Riesling, Sauvignon blanc and Vidal.

Red Varieties include: Cabernet Franc, Cabernet Sauvignon, Merlot, Pinot noir, Gamay noir, and Syrah.

Milestones 
1977
 Vineyard founded by Ewald Reif.
1982
 Winery opens and is housed in 1870s coach house.
1987
 Klaus W. Reif moves to Canada to take over the reins.
1988
 Robert Parker Jr. names 1987 Vidal Icewine on top ten wine list.
1989
 Winemaker Roberto DiDomenico joins Reif.
1991
 New production facility and underground barrel cellar opens.
1997
 Tesoro takes Gold at International Wine & Spirit Competition.
2002
 Best Canadian Winery at Wine & Spirit International Competition.
2004
 Vidal Icewine is Wine of the year at Ontario Wine Awards.
2005
 First Growth Collection is released showcasing Reif terroir.
2007
 Best Meritage at Cuvee for 2002 First Growth Cabernet Merlot.
 Three Gold's presented at Ontario Wine Awards.
 Best Sweet Wine Trophy awarded at Cuvée for Vidal Icewine.
 Installation of Wine Sensory Garden to commemorate 25 years of winemaking.
2008
 Best Sweet Wine Trophy awarded at Cuvée for Vidal Icewine.
 Grand Opening of New Wine Boutique.
2009
 Launch of TREND wine collection.
 Production of Niagara Raisins, a first in Canada.
 First vintage of kiln dried wines including passito-style botrytis affected wines.
2010
 Klaus W. Reif receives Lifetime achievement award from Ontario Wine Society.

Winemakers
Klaus W. Reif was born in the winemaking region of Neustadt, Germany. Klaus was also born into a long line of winemakers in his family, dating back 13 generations. In 1978, Klaus traveled to Canada to visit his Uncle Ewald Reif. Inspired by this visit, Klaus applied to one of Germany's most prestigious winemaking schools, the Geisenheim Institute. Klaus obtained a degree in Oenology and Viticulture, and then moved to Niagara-on-the-Lake, Canada. In 1987 Klaus became President and Winemaker of Reif Estate Winery.

Roberto DiDomenico's father was a winemaker, and Roberto was a winemaker's assistant when he was growing up. In 1985, Roberto attended the University of Guelph and studied Microbiology, focusing on fermentation technology.  While a student, Roberto interned at Reif Estate Winery as a research assistant. After graduating in 1989, he joined the winery as winemaker and is still with the winery today.

References

display=title